Beuda is a Spanish municipality located in the comarca of Garrotxa, in the province of Girona, Catalonia, Spain. It is located on the slopes near the Mont massif, to the north of Besalú.

Places of interest
Església de Sant Feliu - Romanesque; 11th century
Monestir de Sant Sepulcre de Palera - Romanesque; 11th century
Església Santa Maria de Palera
Església de Santa Llúcia de Beuda

References

External links
 Government data pages 

Municipalities in Garrotxa